The Men's downhill competition of the 1960 Winter Olympics was held at Squaw Valley on Monday, February 22. The race was postponed from February 19, due to heavy snow fall.

Austrian Toni Sailer, the defending FIS Downhill World Champion did not compete as he had previously retired.

Jean Vuarnet, the bronze medalist at the world championships two years earlier, won by a half-second in the only Olympic event of his career. It was the first time an Olympic race was won on metal skis.

Helmets
This was the first Olympic downhill in which crash helmets were mandatory, following the race death in 1959 of Canadian John Semmelink at Garmisch, West Germany. During his final race, Semmelink wore a leather helmet, which was more protection than many racers used at the time. The U.S. Ski Team first wore crash helmets at the 1956 Winter Olympics, but most of the Europeans went without.

Results
Monday, February 22, 1960
The race was started at 10:00 local time, (UTC −8).

References

External links
YouTube: Flame in the Snow – an official film of the VIII Olympic Winter Games (1960) – Men's downhill (8:50 to 11:34)
VIII Olympic Winter Games 1960 Squaw Valley, California, Final Report Published by the California Olympic Commission, California State Printing Office, July 1960.

1960
Men's alpine skiing at the 1960 Winter Olympics
Winter Olympics